Phosphatidylinositol transfer protein, cytoplasmic 1 is a protein that in humans is encoded by the PITPNC1 gene.

Function

This gene encodes a member of the phosphatidylinositol transfer protein family. The encoded cytoplasmic protein plays a role in multiple processes including cell signaling and lipid metabolism by facilitating the transfer of phosphatidylinositol between membrane compartments. Alternatively spliced transcript variants encoding multiple isoforms have been observed for this gene, and a pseudogene of this gene is located on the long arm of chromosome 1. [provided by RefSeq, May 2012].

References

Further reading